Rufus is an album featuring saxophonists Archie Shepp and John Tchicai, bassist Don Moore and drummer J. C. Moses. The album was released on the Fontana label in 1963. This group with the addition of trumpeter Don Cherry became known as the New York Contemporary Five and released Consequences for which this album appears to have been a "pilot".

Track listing
 "Rufus" (Archie Shepp) - 11:18
 "Nettus" (John Tchicai) - 12:36
 "Hoppin'" (Tchicai) - 7:10
 "For Helved" (Tchicai) - 12:16
 "Funeral" (Shepp) - 5:05
Recorded in New York City on August 23, 1963.

Personnel
Archie Shepp: tenor saxophone
John Tchicai: alto saxophone
Don Moore: bass
J. C. Moses: drums

References

1963 albums
Archie Shepp albums
Fontana Records albums
John Tchicai albums